Alfreton railway station serves the town of Alfreton in Derbyshire, England.

Alfreton is a penalty fare station when travelling on East Midlands Railway services.

History

Opened by the Midland Railway as Alfreton on 1 May 1862, the station was renamed Alfreton and South Normanton on 7 November 1891. It became part of the London, Midland and Scottish Railway during the Grouping of 1923. The line then passed on to the London Midland Region of British Railways on nationalisation in 1948. The British Railways Board closed the station to passengers on 2 January 1967, due to the Beeching Axe, and the buildings and platforms were subsequently demolished.

When the station reopened on 7 May 1973, it was given the name Alfreton and Mansfield Parkway, as the nearby town of Mansfield in Nottinghamshire did not have a passenger service of its own, making it at the time one of the largest towns in Britain without such a service. Following the reopening of the Robin Hood Line in 1995, Mansfield station re-opened, so Alfreton station reverted to its original name.

When Sectorisation was introduced in the 1980s, the station was served by the Intercity Sector and Provincial, which became Regional Railways until the Privatisation of British Railways.

Facilities 
The station is staffed through the day, with the ticket office open 06:45 - 18:00 Mondays - Saturdays and 10:30 - 18:00 Sundays.  A ticket machine is provided in the main building for use outside these times and for collecting pre-paid tickets.  Toilets are located on platform 1, whilst platform 2 (southbound) has a waiting shelter only.  Train running information is provided by digital CIS screens, automatic announcements, timetable posters and a customer help point on platform 1.  Step-free access is only available for platform 1, as the barrow crossing at the station has been closed and the footbridge linking the platforms has stairs.

Services
There is generally an hourly East Midlands Railway Local service northbound to Liverpool Lime Street via Sheffield and southbound to Norwich via Nottingham.

Northern Trains run an hourly service between Nottingham and  that stops at Alfreton. This service started from the December 2008 timetable change. From 2 April 2017, southbound services began to stop at the newly opened station at Ilkeston.

References

Further reading

External links

 Station on navigable O.S. map

Railway stations in Derbyshire
DfT Category E stations
Former Midland Railway stations
Railway stations in Great Britain opened in 1862
Railway stations in Great Britain closed in 1967
Railway stations in Great Britain opened in 1973
Reopened railway stations in Great Britain
Railway stations served by East Midlands Railway
Northern franchise railway stations
Beeching closures in England
1862 establishments in England
Alfreton